The Australasian Law Teachers Association (ALTA) is a professional body which represents the interests of law teachers in Australia, New Zealand and the South Pacific. To promote excellence in legal academic teaching and research with particular emphasis on early career academics, throughout the Australasia.

Activities
(a)    Legal research and scholarship;

(b)   Curriculum advancement of pedagogical improvements in view of national and international developments, including law reform;

(c)    Government policies and practices that relate to legal education and research;

(d)   Professional development opportunities for legal academics;

(e)    Professional legal education and practices programs.

Membership is open to teachers of law and law librarians in tertiary institutions in the above countries.

ALTA supports the endeavours of Law Academics, in particular around Legal Education, Legal Research and career development. Members have the opportunity to join a number of Interest Groups which puts them in touch with other academics in their field(s).

Annual Conferences
ALTA holds an Annual Conference which is held at a different law school each year. Previous Conferences have been hosted by:

 Faculty of Law, The University of Sydney (2012),
 Queensland University of Technology in Brisbane (2011),
 The University of Auckland (2010),
 The University of Western Sydney (2009),
 James Cook University (2008),
 The University of Western Australia (2007),
 Victoria University (2006),
 The University of Waikato (2005),
 Charles Darwin University in 2004.

The Conference provides a supportive environment for academics to present papers on their areas of research, and is also a place to develop networks and friendships with other academics within Australasia.

Awards conferred
There are also a number of awards running which correspond with the conference such as the LexisNexis - Australasian Law Teachers Association Award for Excellence and Innovation in the Teaching of Law as well as the CCH-ALTA Best Conference Paper Awards which include a Major Category Award, Early Career Award and Best Paper presented in the Legal Education Interest Group Award.

Publications
Publications of the association are held in numerous libraries in Australia.

Legal Education Review: ALTA’s own Legal Education publication which publishes both General Articles and Practice Articles on Legal Education and is published annually.

Journal of the Australasian Law Teachers Association: ALTA’s journal containing diverse areas of legal research as it is a collection of published ALTA conference papers. The papers can be from any interest group and are double-blind refereed before being accepted for publication in the journal.

Legal Education Digest: Publication of the Centre for Legal Education, UTS, is published tri-annually and is a reviewof articles and other publications which focus on Legal Education. Over 200 journals, including working papers and research monographs, are kept under review.

ALTA Newsletter: Published bi-annually and includes an update on what is happening at ALTA, as well as conference and publication updates and other articles of interest.

References

External links
Official website

Law-related professional associations
Law-related learned societies
International organizations based in Oceania
Professional associations based in Australia
Education-related professional associations